Michael Giorgas is am Australian-born Russian rugby league footballer who represented Russia in the 2000 World Cup. He was named on the bench in Russia's 4-110 loss to Australia.

Career
In the Australian championship, he is known for his performance for the Logan City club. He opted for representing Russia at international level due to his Russian heritage, and in total, seven Australian players were included in the Russia national team. He took part at the qualifiers for the 2000 World Cup and played only the match during the finals.

References

Living people
Australian rugby league players
Russia national rugby league team players
Year of birth missing (living people)
Place of birth missing (living people)
Australian people of Russian descent